Dasha may be:

 Dashā, a planetary period in Indian astrology
dáśan-, the Sanskrit for "ten", in the nominative and in compounds
Dashavatara, the ten avatars of the Hindu god Vishnu
An alternate transliteration of Dacha, a Russian summer home
Dasha, Kaiping (大沙镇), town in Guangdong, China
Dasha, Duchang County (大沙镇), town in Duchang County, Jiangxi, China
A Russian diminutive for Daria

People
Given name
A female given name of Slavic origin, a diminutive of 'Daria'.
Dasha Astafieva, Ukrainian model and singer
Dasha Zhukova, Russian philanthropist, entrepreneur, model, fashion designer and magazine editor
Dasha Nekrasova, Belarusian actress, writer, podcaster and model, also known as "Sailor Socialism"

Fictional characters
Dasha Plank, Zenon's adoptive cousin in Zenon: Z3, played by Alyson Morgan
Dasha, a character who is Masha's cousin in Masha and the Bear.

See also
Dacha, a second or seasonal home in Russia
Dacia (disambiguation)